On November 6, 2018, the District of Columbia held a U.S. House of Representatives election for its shadow representative. Unlike its non-voting delegate, the shadow representative is only recognized by the district and is not officially sworn or seated. Incumbent Shadow Representative Franklin Garcia won reelection unopposed.

Primary elections

Democratic primary

Candidates
 Franklin Garcia, incumbent Shadow Representative (since 2015)

Results

Other primaries
The Republican, Libertarian, and D.C. Statehood Green parties all held primaries, but no candidates declared.

Other candidates
Independent write-in candidate Erik Metzroth was the only opposition to Franklin Garcia. Metzroth campaigned alleging that Garcia had done too little to advance the cause of DC statehood. Metzroth also criticized local media for not reporting on his campaign. The final number of write-in votes cast for Metzroth was unreported.

Write-in
Erik Metzroth (not recognized as candidate by Board of Elections)

General election
The general election took place on November 6, 2018. Garcia was the only candidate on the ballot and won reelection to a third term.

Results

References

Washington, D.C., Shadow Representative elections
2018 elections in Washington, D.C.